Secció Esportiva AEM Women, shortly SE AEM,  is a Spanish women's football team from Lleida, Segrià, currently playing in the Primera Federación (women).

References

Women's football clubs in Spain
Segunda Federación (women) clubs
Sport in Lleida
Football clubs in Catalonia
Primera Federación (women) clubs